Bish Aghaj (also Romanized as Bīsh Āghāj; also known as Besh Āghāch and Bīsheh Āghāj) is a village in Jowkar Rural District, Jowkar District, Malayer County, Hamadan Province, Iran. At the 2006 census, its population was 47, in 11 families.

References 

Populated places in Malayer County